Hallett Cove may refer to:

South Australia
Hallett Cove, South Australia, a suburb in the Adelaide metropolitan area
Hallett Cove Conservation Park, a protected area
Hallett Cove railway station
Hallett Cove School

See also
Hallett Cove Beach railway station